Altair Engineering Inc. is an American multinational information technology company headquartered in Troy, Michigan. It provides software and cloud solutions for simulation, IoT, high performance computing (HPC), data analytics, and artificial intelligence (AI). Altair Engineering is the creator of the HyperWorks CAE software product, among numerous other software packages and suites. The company was founded in 1985 and went public in 2017. It is traded on the Nasdaq stock exchange under the stock ticker symbol ALTR.

History

Founding 
Altair Engineering was founded in 1985 by James R. Scapa, George Christ, and Mark Kistner in Troy, Michigan. Since the company's outset, Scapa has served as its CEO (and now chairman). Initially, Altair started as an engineering consulting firm, but branched out into product development and computer-aided engineering (CAE) software. In the 1990s, it became known for its software products like HyperWorks, OptiStruct, and HyperMesh, which were often used for product development by the automotive industry. Some of Altair's early clients included the Ford Motor Company, General Motors, and Chrysler. Its software also aided in the development of the Young America and AmericaOne racing yachts, the former of which was used to compete in the 1995 America's Cup.

Its software also found uses in other sectors, including aerospace (NASA), aviation (Airbus), consumer electronics (Nokia), and toy manufacturing (Mattel), among others. In 2002, Altair software aided in the design of the Airbus A380 by weight optimizing the aircraft wing ribs. That year, the company moved into a new headquarters in Troy, Michigan. It maintained separate offices in Allen Park, Michigan. Also in 2002, Altair opened offices in Seongnam, South Korea and Shanghai, China, adding those locales to its international footprint alongside India where it had begun investment in 1992.

Early 2000's and 2017 IPO 
In addition to its software production, Altair hires out engineering consultants to its corporate clientele. Its consultancy services accounted for the majority of the company's revenue until 2004, when the sale and licensing of software overtook that. In October of that year, General Atlantic invested $30 million in Altair. Also in 2004, Altair partnered with General Motors and the United States Department of Defense on the design and construction of a new military vehicle.

Altair also branched out into the life sciences, finance, and pharmaceutical industries with its high performance computing software, PBS Professional, which it had acquired the rights to in 2003. In June 2006, Altair acquired the French CAE software company, Mecalog, and its Radioss technology suite. In 2007, it spun off a new wholly-owned subsidiary called ilumisys, which would focus on light-emitting diode (LED) lamps designed to be used as direct replacements for fluorescent light tubes. Ilumisys' operations were moved to Michigan in 2011, and it was rebranded as Toggled in 2012.

In the early 2010s, Altair's product design division (Altair ProductDesign) began creating prototypes of various vehicles including a hydraulic hybrid transit bus known as BUSolution and an electric concept car called the Avant GT. By 2013, the company had offices in 19 countries worldwide and 1,800 employees. That year, it also bought out General Atlantic's equity stake in the company.

On November 1, 2017, Altair went public with an IPO on the Nasdaq stock exchange and began trading under the stock ticker symbol ALTR. The company raised $156 million with share prices starting at $13. In the years leading up to the IPO, Altair acquired 11 different companies with strategic assets and expertise in fields like material science, electronics, industrial design, rendering, and others. The company then made its products available to qualified startup companies through its Startup Program, formed in 2018 and relaunched in 2021.

By 2019, the company had acquired a total of 30 businesses. It also began making efforts to incorporate artificial intelligence technology into its new software packages. That year, it opened a new office in Greensboro, North Carolina after acquiring the data analytics company, Datawatch, which had offices in the area.

2020s 
In June 2020, the company announced that it would be providing software updates for all of its products. The updates were implemented to improve workflows and provide access to a broader set of tools for data analytics, machine learning, and physics. In January 2021, Altair announced that it would collaborate with Rolls-Royce Holdings on a project using AI and machine learning to improve the aero jet engine design process. In November 2021, Altair's PBS Professional workload manager was selected by the Argonne National Laboratory to be used across the organization's high performance computing (HPC) systems, including the Polaris and Aurora supercomputers. That same month, Altair was also included on Inc. Magazine's 2021 Best-Led Companies list. In December, Altair was named as one of Investor's Business Daily's Best 100 ESG Companies.

Products

Altair develops and provides software and cloud services for product development, high-performance computing (HPC), simulation, artificial intelligence, and data intelligence.  The company also offers its customers access to software applications from over 55 different software companies through its Altair Partner Alliance.  

Altair SmartWorks
 An IoT product development solution.
Altair Panopticon
 A data visualization and monitoring software.
Altair HyperWorks
A computer-aided engineering (CAE) program that enables finite element analysis, modeling, and simulation.
Altair HyperMesh
 A finite element pre-processor.
Altair OptiStruct
Topology optimization tool that provides structural analysis and performance validation.
Altair SimSolid
A mesh-less structural analysis tool.
Altair Knowledge Works
Software that allows users to pull data from a variety of sources, transform it, and make machine learning models based on it.
Altair PBS Works
Is a workload management tool that leverages high-performance computing.
Altair One A collaboration platform to access all Altair's simulation, HPC, and data analytics capabilities.
Altair Monarch
 Self-service data preparation solutions.
RapidMiner
 Data science platform.

Corporate acquisitions

Since 1985, Altair has acquired over 30 businesses, business units, and software packages. The following is a list of selected corporate acquisitions:

See also 

 Finite Element Software 
 FEKO
 Monarch
 Portable Batch System
 Computational Grid
 Big Data
 Distributed Computing
 Cloud Computing
 Data Analytics
 Optimization

References

Software companies based in Michigan
Engineering companies of the United States
Computer-aided engineering software
Companies based in Troy, Michigan
Companies established in 1985
Companies listed on the Nasdaq
2017 initial public offerings
Software companies of the United States
Business software companies
Business intelligence companies
Business software
Extract, transform, load tools
Analytics companies
Data analysis software
Engineering software companies
Grid computing
Finite element software